E. Warren Clark (1849–1907) was an American educator who taught thousands of young Japanese the rudiments of modern science while employed as a teacher in Japan from 1871 to 1875.  Clark was born in Portsmouth, New Hampshire and graduated from what is now Rutgers University in New Jersey in 1869 with a degree in Chemistry and Biology.  He was one of several hundred teachers hired by the Japanese government to familiarize students with the science and technology of the West. Clark first taught at a school in Shizuoka that trained students to become science teachers.  He later taught
at what became Tokyo University in Tokyo, where he helped to found the chemistry department, one of the first of its kind in Japan. A devout Christian, Clark sought to introduce the Bible and Christian doctrines to his students whenever possible.  After returning to the United States Clark wrote a highly informative book about Japan: Life and Adventure in Japan (New York: American Tract Society, 1878).
Clark, who later became an Episcopalian priest, visited Japan on two later occasions and worked hard to garner American support for Japan during the Russo-Japanese War (1904–05).  Clark was a close associate of William Elliot Griffis (1842–1928), widely regarded as the first major American Japanologist.

References

Further reading
Metraux, Daniel A., "Lay Proselytization of Christianity in Japan in the Meiji Period: The Career of E. Warren Clark." New England Social Studies Bulletin, 44:3 (1986) 40–50.
Daniel Metraux and Jessica Puglisi, Eds, E. Warren Clark's "Life and Adventure in Japan" (Writer's Club Press, 2002).

19th-century American educators
Rutgers University alumni
1849 births
1907 deaths
People from Portsmouth, New Hampshire
Educators from New Hampshire